Paley Park is a pocket park located at 3 East 53rd Street between Madison and Fifth Avenues in Midtown Manhattan, New York City, on the former site of the Stork Club. Designed by the landscape architectural firm of Zion Breen Richardson Associates, it opened May 23, 1967. Paley Park is often cited as one of the finest urban spaces in the United States.

Description 
Measuring , the park contains airy trees, lightweight furniture and simple spatial organization. The waterfall creates a backdrop of grey noise to mask the sounds of the city. The park is surrounded by walls on three sides and is open to the street (with an ornamental gate) on the fourth side, facing the street. The walls are covered in ivy, and an overhead canopy is formed by honey locust trees.

A privately owned public space, Paley Park was financed by the William S. Paley Foundation and was named by Paley for his father, Samuel Paley. A plaque near the entrance reads: "This park is set aside in memory of Samuel Paley, 1875–1963, for the enjoyment of the public."

Design features 
A wheelchair ramp is positioned on either side of the four steps that lead into the park which is elevated from the sidewalk level. The park displays a unique blend of synthetic materials, textures, colors and sounds. The wire mesh chairs and marble tables are light, while the ground surfaces are rough-hewn granite pavers which extend across the sidewalk to the street curb. The honey locust trees were planted at  intervals. The green of the ivy-covered side walls ("vertical lawns") contrast with colorful flowers.

The Paley Center for Media was originally next to Paley Park.

Impact 
In 1968, Paley Park and the Ford Foundation Building shared an Albert S. Bard Civic Award, distributed to structures that exhibited "excellence in architecture and urban design".

Social interaction in the park was analyzed in the film The Social Life of Small Urban Spaces by William H. Whyte.

Paley Park also inspired the similarly sized Theodora Park in Charleston, South Carolina, which opened in June 2015.

References

Further reading 
 
 

Parks in Manhattan
Midtown Manhattan
Pocket parks
1967 establishments in New York City
Privately owned public spaces